{{Infobox Prime Minister
| name = Sitaram Bhagwat
| image =
| imagesize = 200px'| birth_date = 20 September 1904

| birth_place = Chhatarpur, Central Province, British India
| death_date = 
| death_place = Jhansi, UP, India
| profession = Doctor
| spouse = Savitri Bai
| party = Indian National Congress
}}Pandit Sitārām Bhāskar Bhāgwat''' (20 September 1904 – 21 August 1999) was an Indian political and social leader in Uttar Pradesh, India.

Personal
 Born on 20 September 1904 in Maharajpur village, Chhatarpur district, in Madhya Pradesh.
He was the second son of Pandit Bhaskar Narayan Bhagwat, who was a teacher at Maharajpur village, Chhatarpur district. 
 Studied at Maharaja's High School, Chhatarpur.
 Came to Jhansi for higher studies.
 Married to Savitri Bai.
 Died on 21 August 1999 in Jhansi.

Independence movement
He actively participated in all the independence movements between 1921 and 1942. He was sent to jail several times. His wife, Savitri Bai Bhagwat also was jailed with her infant daughter.
He was the main pillar of Congress' independence movement in Jhansi along with Pandit Raghunath Dhulekar. He was also a close friend of revolutionaries like Chandrashekhar Azad, Sadashivrao Malkapurkar, Bhagwan Das mahaur, etc.
He was the president of Congress committee of Jhansi for many years.

After Independence
He continued teaching at Bundelkhand Ayurvedic College, Jhansi till 1974. He was the Pro Vice Chancellor of Jhansi Ayurvedic University. Sitaram Bhagwat was instrumental in promoting education in Bundelkhand area and had played important roles in building temples of education in the region, namely, Bundelkhand c College, Bundelkhand Degree College, Sanatan Dharma Kanya Inter College (for education of girls), and many others.
He was an adroit physician and practised pure Ayurveda till his death.

Books authored
 Nagari Nootan Shiksha Paddhati(Published)
 Hruday Rog evam unki Chikitsa(Unpublished)
 Vajikaran evam Rasaayn Shaastra(Unpublished)
 Chandrashekhar Azad ke Sansmaran''(Unpublished)

People from Jhansi
1999 deaths
1904 births
People from Chhatarpur district
Indian National Congress politicians from Uttar Pradesh
Social leaders